Stephen Beck is an American artist, writer, toy designer and inventor who pioneered video synthesis and interactive video art.
Examples of his work have appeared in collections including the San Francisco Museum of Modern Art, the Museum of Modern Art, New York and the Whitney Museum of American Art.

He holds several patents in phosphene based video display technology and energy management.  His writings have appeared in Wired Magazine and the New York Times and he was artist in residence at KQED – NCET for the National Center for Experiments in Television.

References
 Stephen Beck at UC Berkeley's Center for New Media
 Sorceress of Software Wired Magazine – May 1998
 Direct Video Synthesizer (Analog), 1970 Beck Video Weaver (Digital), 1974

External links
 Official Site
 Stephen Beck's VSynths
 Video Weavings (excerpt) 1976

American artists
Living people
Toy designers
Year of birth missing (living people)